Inna Rose (born 10 April 1958) is an Estonian sports shooter. She competed in two events at the 1992 Summer Olympics.

References

External links

Inna Rose @ESBL

1958 births
Living people
Estonian female sport shooters
Olympic shooters of Estonia
Shooters at the 1992 Summer Olympics
People from Tomsk